The 58th Academy Awards ceremony, organized by the Academy of Motion Picture Arts and Sciences (AMPAS), took place on March 24, 1986, at the Dorothy Chandler Pavilion in Los Angeles beginning at 6:00 p.m. PST / 9:00 p.m. EST. During the ceremony, AMPAS presented Academy Awards (commonly referred to as Oscars) in 23 categories honoring films released in 1985. The ceremony, televised in the United States by ABC, was produced by Stanley Donen and directed by Marty Pasetta. Actors Alan Alda, Jane Fonda, and Robin Williams co-hosted the show. Fonda hosted the gala for the second time, having previously been a co-host of the 49th ceremony held in 1977. Meanwhile, this was Alda and Williams's first Oscars hosting stint. Eight days earlier, in a ceremony held at The Beverly Hilton in Beverly Hills, California, on March 16, the Academy Awards for Technical Achievement were presented by host Macdonald Carey.

Out of Africa won seven awards, including Best Picture. Meanwhile, fellow Best Picture nominee The Color Purple failed to win any of its eleven nominations. Other winners included Cocoon and Witness with two awards and Anna & Bella, Back to the Future, Broken Rainbow, Kiss of the Spider Woman, Mask, Molly's Pilgrim, The Official Story, Prizzi's Honor, Ran, The Trip to Bountiful, White Nights, and Witness to War: Dr. Charlie Clements with one. The telecast received both positive and negative reviews, and it garnered 37.8 million viewers in the United States.

Winners and nominees

The nominees for the 58th Academy Awards were announced on February 4, 1986, by Academy president Robert Wise and actress Patty Duke. The Color Purple and Out of Africa led all nominees with eleven each. Winners were announced during the awards ceremony on March 24, 1986. With its 11 nominations and zero wins, The Color Purple joined 1977's The Turning Point as the most nominated films in Oscar history without a single win. At age 79, John Huston became the oldest person nominated for Best Director. His daughter Anjelica's victory in the Best Supporting Actress category made her the first third-generation Oscar winner in history. For the first time in Oscars history, all lead acting nominees were born in the United States. Argentina's The Official Story became the first Latin American film to win the Best Foreign Language Film category.

Awards
Winners are listed first, highlighted in boldface and indicated with a double dagger.

{| role="presentation" class=wikitable
|-
| style="vertical-align:top; width:50%;"|

Out of Africa – Sydney Pollack, producerThe Color Purple – Steven Spielberg, Kathleen Kennedy, Frank Marshall and Quincy Jones, producers
Kiss of the Spider Woman – David Weisman, producer
Prizzi's Honor – John Foreman, producer
Witness – Edward S. Feldman, producer
| style="vertical-align:top; width:50%;"|Sydney Pollack – Out of Africa
Héctor Babenco – Kiss of the Spider Woman
John Huston – Prizzi's Honor
Akira Kurosawa – Ran
Peter Weir – Witness
|-
| style="vertical-align:top; width:50%;"|

William Hurt – Kiss of the Spider Woman as Luis Molina
Harrison Ford – Witness as Detective Captain John Book
James Garner – Murphy's Romance as Murphy Jones
Jack Nicholson – Prizzi's Honor as Charley Partanna
Jon Voight – Runaway Train as Oscar "Manny" Manheim
| style="vertical-align:top; width:50%;"|

Geraldine Page – The Trip to Bountiful as Carrie Watts
Anne Bancroft – Agnes of God as Miriam Ruth
Whoopi Goldberg – The Color Purple as Celie Harris Johnson
Jessica Lange – Sweet Dreams as Patsy Cline
Meryl Streep – Out of Africa as Karen Blixen
|-
| style="vertical-align:top; width:50%;"|

Don Ameche – Cocoon as Arthur Selwyn
Klaus Maria Brandauer – Out of Africa as Baron Bror von Blixen-Finecke
William Hickey – Prizzi's Honor as Don Corrado Prizzi
Robert Loggia – Jagged Edge as Sam Ransom
Eric Roberts – Runaway Train as Buck
| style="vertical-align:top; width:50%;"|

Anjelica Huston – Prizzi's Honor as Maerose Prizzi
Margaret Avery – The Color Purple as Shug Avery
Amy Madigan – Twice in a Lifetime as Sunny Sobel
Meg Tilly – Agnes of God as Sister Agnes
Oprah Winfrey – The Color Purple as Sofia Johnson
|-
| style="vertical-align:top; width:50%;"|

Witness – Screenplay by Earl W. Wallace and William Kelley; Story by William Kelley, Pamela Wallace and Earl W. WallaceBack to the Future – Robert Zemeckis and Bob Gale
Brazil – Terry Gilliam, Tom Stoppard and Charles McKeown
The Official Story – Luis Puenzo and Aída Bortnik
The Purple Rose of Cairo – Woody Allen
| style="vertical-align:top; width:50%;"|Out of Africa – Kurt Luedtke based on the memoir by Isak Dinesen and the books Silence Will Speak by Errol Trzebinski and Isak Dinesen: The Life of a Storyteller by Judith ThurmanThe Color Purple – Menno Meyjes based on the novel by Alice Walker
Kiss of the Spider Woman – Leonard Schrader based on the novel by Manuel Puig
Prizzi's Honor – Richard Condon and Janet Roach based on the novel by Richard Condon
The Trip to Bountiful – Horton Foote based on his teleplay
|-
| style="vertical-align:top; width:50%;"|The Official Story (Argentina) in Spanish – Luis PuenzoAngry Harvest (Federal Republic of Germany) in German – Agnieszka Holland
Colonel Redl (Hungary) in German – István Szabó
Three Men and a Cradle (France) in French – Coline Serreau
When Father Was Away on Business (Yugoslavia) in Serbo-Croatian – Emir Kusturica
| style="vertical-align:top; width:50%;"|Broken Rainbow – Maria Florio and Victoria MuddThe Mothers of Plaza de Mayo – Susana Muñoz and Lourdes Portillo
Soldiers in Hiding – Japhet Asher
The Statue of Liberty – Ken Burns and Buddy Squires
Unfinished Business – Steven Okazaki
|-
| style="vertical-align:top; width:50%;"|Witness to War: Dr. Charlie Clements – David GoodmanThe Courage to Care – Robert H. Gardner
Keats and His Nightingale: A Blind Date – Michael Crowley and James Wolpaw
Making Overtures: The Story of a Community Orchestra – Barbara Willis Sweete
The Wizard of the Strings – Alan Edelstein
| style="vertical-align:top; width:50%;"|Molly's Pilgrim – Jeffrey D. Brown and Chris PelzerGraffiti – Dianna Costello
Rainbow War – Bob Rogers
|-
| style="vertical-align:top; width:50%;"|Anna & Bella – Cilia van DijkThe Big Snit – Richard Condie and Michael J. F. Scott
Second Class Mail – Alison Snowden
| style="vertical-align:top; width:50%;"|Out of Africa – John BarryAgnes of God – Georges Delerue
The Color Purple – Quincy Jones, Jeremy Lubbock, Rod Temperton, Caiphus Semenya, Andraé Crouch, Chris Boardman, Jorge Calandrelli, Joel Rosenbaum, Fred Steiner, Jack Hayes, Jerry Hey and Randy Kerber
Silverado – Bruce Broughton
Witness – Maurice Jarre
|-
| style="vertical-align:top; width:50%;"|"Say You, Say Me" from White Nights – Music and Lyrics by Lionel Richie"Miss Celie's Blues (Sister)" from The Color Purple – Music by Quincy Jones and Rod Temperton; Lyrics by Quincy Jones, Rod Temperton and Lionel Richie
"The Power of Love" from Back to the Future – Music by Chris Hayes and Johnny Colla; Lyrics by Huey Lewis
"Separate Lives" from White Nights – Music and Lyrics by Stephen Bishop
"Surprise Surprise" from A Chorus Line – Music by Marvin Hamlisch; Lyrics by Edward Kleban
| style="vertical-align:top; width:50%;"|Back to the Future – Charles L. Campbell and Robert RutledgeLadyhawke – Robert G. Henderson and Alan Robert Murray
Rambo: First Blood Part II – Frederick Brown
|-
| style="vertical-align:top; width:50%;"|Out of Africa – Chris Jenkins, Gary Alexander, Larry Stensvold and Peter HandfordBack to the Future – Bill Varney, B. Tennyson Sebastian II, Robert Thirlwell and William B. Kaplan
A Chorus Line – Donald O. Mitchell, Michael Minkler, Gerry Humphreys and Christopher Newman
Ladyhawke – Les Fresholtz, Dick Alexander, Vern Poore and Bud Alper
Silverado – Donald O. Mitchell, Rick Kline, Kevin O'Connell and David M. Ronne
| style="vertical-align:top; width:50%;"|Out of Africa – Art direction: Stephen B. Grimes; Set decoration: Josie MacAvinBrazil – Art direction: Norman Garwood; Set decoration: Maggie Gray
The Color Purple – Art direction: J. Michael Riva and Robert W. Welch; Set Decoration: Linda DeScenna
Ran – Art direction and Set decoration: Yoshirō Muraki and Shinobu Muraki
Witness – Art direction: Stan Jolley; Set decoration: John H. Anderson
|-
| style="vertical-align:top; width:50%;"|Out of Africa – David WatkinThe Color Purple – Allen Daviau
Murphy's Romance – William A. Fraker
Ran – Takao Saito, Masaharu Ueda and Asakazu Nakai
Witness – John Seale
| style="vertical-align:top; width:50%;"|Mask – Michael Westmore and Zoltan ElekThe Color Purple – Ken Chase
Remo Williams: The Adventure Begins – Carl Fullerton
|-
| style="vertical-align:top; width:50%;"|Ran – Emi WadaThe Color Purple – Aggie Guerard Rodgers
The Journey of Natty Gann – Albert Wolsky
Out of Africa – Milena Canonero
Prizzi's Honor – Donfeld
| style="vertical-align:top; width:50%;"|Witness – Thom NobleA Chorus Line – John Bloom
Out of Africa – Fredric Steinkamp, William Steinkamp, Pembroke J. Herring and Sheldon Kahn
Prizzi's Honor – Rudi Fehr and Kaja Fehr
Runaway Train – Henry Richardson
|-
| colspan="1" style="vertical-align:top" width="50%"|Cocoon – Ken Ralston, Ralph McQuarrie, Scott Farrar and David Berry'''Return to Oz – Will Vinton, Ian Wingrove, Zoran Perisic and Michael LloydYoung Sherlock Holmes – Dennis Muren, Kit West, John R. Ellis and David W. Allen
! style="background:#FFF; border-top:1px solid #FFF; border-bottom:1px solid #FFF; border-right:1px solid #FFF"|
|}

Honorary Academy Awards
 Paul Newman  "In recognition of his many and memorable compelling screen performances and for his personal integrity and dedication to his craft."
 Alex North  "In recognition of his brilliant artistry in the creation of memorable music for a host of distinguished motion pictures."

Jean Hersholt Humanitarian Award
The award recognizes individuals whose humanitarian efforts have brought credit to the motion picture industry.

 Charles "Buddy" Rogers

Multiple nominations and awards

Presenters and performers
The following individuals, in order of appearance, presented awards or performed musical numbers.

Ceremony information
Determined to revive interest surrounding the awards and reverse declining ratings, the Academy hired Stanley Donen in December 1985 to produce the telecast for the first time. The following February, actor and comedian Robin Williams was selected as host of the 1986 telecast. Actor Alan Alda and two-time Oscar-winning actress Jane Fonda were later announced to join Williams in sharing emceeing duties.

Several other people were involved with the production of the ceremony. Marty Pasetta was hired as director of the telecast. Lionel Newman served as musical director and conductor for the ceremony. Actress Teri Garr performed the titular song from Flying Down to Rio during the opening segment. Singer Irene Cara sang the Frank Sinatra song "Here's to the Losers" in honor of unsuccessful Oscar nominees throughout history. A song-and-dance number featuring actor and singer Howard Keel and several actresses including Cyd Charisse, Leslie Caron, and Debbie Reynolds paid tribute to Metro-Goldwyn-Mayer musicals.

Box office performance of nominated films
At the time of the nominations announcement on February 5, the combined gross of the five Best Picture nominees at the US box office was $119 million with an average of $23.9 million. Witness was the highest earner among the Best Picture nominees with $68.7 million in the domestic box office receipts. The film was followed by Out of Africa ($55.6 million), The Color Purple ($46.4 million), Prizzi's Honor ($26.7 million) and Kiss of the Spider Woman ($13.4 million).

Of the 50 grossing films of the year, 42 nominations went to 12 films on the list. Only Back to the Future (1st), Cocoon (4th), Witness (5th), Jagged Edge (20th), The Color Purple (21st), Prizzi's Honor (30th), Agnes of God (32nd) were nominated for Best Picture, directing, acting, or screenplay. The other top 50 box office hits that earned nominations were Rambo: First Blood Part II (2nd), Mask (14th), White Nights (22nd), Silverado (27th), Young Sherlock Holmes (44th), and Ladyhawke (46th).

Critical reviews
Terrence O'Flaherty of the San Francisco Chronicle wrote, "Last night's sustained-release Oscar pill moved faster through the system than most, but from a standpoint of taste it was the worst in years." Regarding Alda, Fonda, and Williams's hosting performance, he commented, "Together they immediately placed a fatal suggestion in the viewer's mind that there must be a shortage of elegant people in the movie business today." Chicago Tribune film critic Gene Siskel noted that after co-host Williams opened the ceremony with a slew of humorous jokes, "The show regrettably returned to its old bad habits with a boring onstage production number intended to be a tribute to old movies." The Records Joel Pisetzner remarked, "The program might as well have begun with the announcement 'Dead, from L.A. it's Academy night!' "

Television columnist John J. O'Connor of The New York Times quipped, "Suddenly, it seemed, somebody had listened to the complaints that had grown deadeningly familiar over the years." He also added, "Mr. Williams's improvisational, on-the-precipice style of humor brought the event's comic tone thumpingly into the 1980s." Yardena Arar from the Los Angeles Daily News said, "This time, the ABC telecast didn't drown in the thank yous–or, for that matter, boring presentation speeches and production numbers." Furthermore, she observed, "The writing was by and large brisk, the production numbers fair (in the case of the Oscar-nominated songs) to fabulous (Keel's medley with a bevy of former leading ladies)." Houston Chronicle'' television critic Ann Hodges remarked, "Oscar 1986 goes into the record books as a very good year–the year the Academy parked the pompous and let the show biz show." She also lauded the winners' acceptance speeches and the various musical numbers during the broadcast.

Ratings and reception
The American telecast on ABC drew in an average of 37.8 million people over its length, which was a 2% decrease from the previous year's ceremony. Moreover, the show drew lower Nielsen ratings compared to the previous ceremony with 27.3% of households watching with a 43% share. At the time, it earned the lowest viewership for an Academy Award telecast and the lowest ratings for any broadcast.

In July 1986, the ceremony presentation received four nominations at the 38th Primetime Emmys. The following month, the ceremony won one of those nominations for Outstanding Art Direction for a Variety Program (Roy Christopher).

See also
 List of submissions to the 58th Academy Awards for Best Foreign Language Film

Notes

References

Bibliography

External links
 Academy Awards official website
 The Academy of Motion Picture Arts and Sciences official website
 Oscars' channel on YouTube run by the Academy of Motion Picture Arts and Sciences

Analysis
 1985 Academy Awards Winners and History Filmsite

Other resources

Academy Awards ceremonies
1985 film awards
1986 in Los Angeles
1986 in American cinema
March 1986 events in the United States
Academy
Television shows directed by Marty Pasetta